Thomas or Tom McHugh may refer to:

Thomas J. McHugh (1919–2000), American soldier in World War II and the Korean War
Thomas McHugh (politician), first Secretary of State of Wisconsin
Thomas McHugh (judge), American jurist
Tom Ed McHugh (born 1943), Louisiana politician
Tom McHugh (mayor), county councillor and mayor of County Galway 2009–10
Tom McHugh (American football), American gridiron football player and coach